Pascal Lukoki Kalemba (26 February 1979 – 27 November 2012) was a Congolese footballer who played as a goalkeeper.

Career
Born in Kinshasa, Kalemba played club football in the DR Congo and Gabon for TP Mazembe, AS Vita Club, Delta Téléstar, DC Motema Pembe and Missile FC.

He earned 25 caps for the national team between 2001 and 2006, representing them at the African Cup of Nations in 2002 and 2006. He also played in 9 FIFA World Cup qualifying matches.

Later life and death
He died on 27 November 2012.

References

1979 births
2012 deaths
Democratic Republic of the Congo footballers
Democratic Republic of the Congo international footballers
Democratic Republic of the Congo expatriate footballers
Association football goalkeepers
Expatriate footballers in Gabon
TP Mazembe players
Daring Club Motema Pembe players
2002 African Cup of Nations players
2006 Africa Cup of Nations players
Footballers from Kinshasa
AS Vita Club players
Delta Téléstar players